New York's 82nd State Assembly district is one of the 150 districts in the New York State Assembly. It has been represented by Democrat Michael Benedetto since 2005.

Geography
District 82 is in The Bronx. It encompasses Co-op City, Throggs Neck, Westchester Square, City Island, Country Club, and Pelham Bay.

Recent election results

2022

2020

2018

2016

2014

2012

2010

2008

References

82